Model was a Turkish rock band based in İzmir, Turkey.

History 
The band was founded with name A due Carmen in 2005 by Okan Işık, Aşkın Çolak and Can Temiz. Fatma Turgut and Serkan Gürüzümcü joined in 2007. The band members found each other on the internet. The group's name was changed to Model in 2008. Their first album, Perili Sirk was released in 2009.

In 2011, Model released its second album, called Diğer Masallar, which was produced by Demir Demirkan. Three songs, "Buzdan Şato", "Değmesin Ellerimiz", "Bir Melek Vardı", became very popular.

In 2012, Aşkın Çolak left the band and was replaced by Kerem Sedef on drums.

Their third album, Levlâ'nın Hikayesi, was put on the market by the label of GNL Entertainment in the last week of the November 2013. Model wanted to create a concept in this album: the five stages of mourning after separation, and then a human's own internal reckoning and relations are told with the help of the lyrics.

The band disbanded in 2016 due to differences between the members.

Awards 
2010 Digital Age Awards - Most Innovative Music / Sound Design winner song composed for Efes Pilsen.
The band also won the Billboard Special Jury Award in Roxy Music Days under the name "A due Carmen"

Discography 

 Perili Sirk (2009)
 Diğer Masallar (2011)
 Levlâ'nın Hikayesi (2013)
 Mey (2016)

References

Musical groups from Istanbul
Turkish alternative rock groups
Musical groups established in 2005
Musical groups disestablished in 2016